The Estonia men's national tennis team represents Estonia in Davis Cup tennis competition and are governed by the Estonian Tennis Association.

History
Estonia competed in its first Davis Cup in 1934–35. From 1945 to 1992, Estonian players represented the Soviet Union.

Timeline
1993 Europe/Africa Zone Group III
1994–1995 Europe/Africa Zone Group II
1996–1999 Europe/Africa Zone Group III
2000–2001 Europe/Africa Zone Group II
2002–2004 Europe/Africa Zone Group III
2005 Europe/Africa Zone Group II
2006 Europe/Africa Zone Group III
2007 Europe/Africa Zone Group II
2008–2009 Europe/Africa Zone Group III
2010–2013 Europe/Africa Zone Group II
2014–2016 Europe/Africa Zone Group III
2017–2018 Europe/Africa Zone Group II
2019 Europe Zone Group III
2020 World Group II Play-offs & World Group II
2022 World Group II Play-offs & World Group II
2023 World Group II Play-offs

Recent performances

1990s

2000s

2010s

2020s

Current team (2023) 

 Kristjan Tamm
 Kenneth Raisma
 Jürgen Zopp
 Johannes Seeman
 Oliver Ojakäär

See also
Davis Cup
Estonia Fed Cup team

References

External links

Team page at Estonian Tennis Association

Davis Cup teams
Davis Cup
Davis Cup